Thornhill Park is a suburb in Melbourne, Victoria, Australia,  west of Melbourne's Central Business District, located within the City of Melton local government area. Thornhill Park recorded a population of 3,066 at the 2021 census.

The suburb was gazetted by the Office of Geographic Names on 9 February 2017, following a proposal for eleven new suburbs by the City of Melton. The new name officially came into effect in mid-2017.

Prior to the suburb's creation, the area was mostly part of Rockbank, with a small section previously part of Mount Cottrell, in the south.

Recreation

Thornhill Park is currently home to Wiltshire Boulevard Reserve, which contains open space, community facilities and a playground. There are also wetlands in the north, in between Exmouth Street and the Western Highway.

Development Critisim

Residents of Thornhill Park have criticized developers Wel.Co and the Victorian State Government for failing to provide adequate transport connections to the suburb. Masterplan images released by Wel.Co advertised a railway station located in the center of the suburb and an overpass on Mount Cottrell Rd allowing traffic to travel in both directions on the Western Highway. Neither the train station nor the overpass have been built forcing residents to make a detour to the next highway overpass at Ferris Rd to access shops, schools, and the Melbourne Central Business District.

References

External links

Suburbs of Melbourne
Suburbs of the City of Melton